L.A. by Night is an American actual play web series where the cast plays as vampires using the fifth edition Vampire: The Masquerade ruleset. It is set canonically in the World of Darkness series after the events of Vampire: The Masquerade – Bloodlines and focuses on Kindred society in Los Angeles. It premiered in September 2018; the show's current storyline concluded with its fifth season in 2021. A sequel series, titled NY by Night, started in July 2022.

Cast

Main 

 Jason Carl as the storyteller
Alexander Ward as Jasper
Cynthia Marie as Nelli G.
 B. Dave Walters as Victor Temple
 Erika Ishii as Annabelle
 Xander Jeanneret as X
 Josephine McAdam as Eva

Guest

Premise 
L.A. by Night is a sequel to Vampire: The Masquerade – Bloodlines and deals with the fallout from the game for Kindred society in Los Angeles, however, the events of the show center on a different group of characters. The show focuses on an Anarch coterie when a vampire fledgling, Annabelle, joins the group. Victor and Nelli attempt "to establish baronies of their own while fending off human Hunters and the Second Inquisition". Success then places "the coterie in the path of the Camarilla. That meant having to ensure their ties to fellow barons around L.A. were solid enough that an Anarch revolt could stand a chance, only none of it turned out the way anyone expected. Matters were complicated, not just by the political squabbles in L.A. itself, but by greater events such as the Beckoning".

Production 
L.A. by Night debuted as a production of Geek & Sundry in September 2018, with the company ultimately producing the first three seasons. These remain available on Geek & Sundry's YouTube channel. The company, then approximately at its peak in terms of Twitch subscriptions and viewership, launched several shows under a "Nerdoween" moniker for Halloween 2018, including L.A. by Night. The show was in part intended to promote Legendary Digital Networks' streaming platform Alpha, premiering there as well as on Geek & Sundry's Twitch channel. The first three seasons featured many guest characters portrayed primarily by actors from other LDN shows- including Marisha Ray and Taliesin Jaffe of Critical Role, Jessica Chobot and Hector Navarro of Mothership, and Jason C. Miller of Starter Kit.

Alpha would shut down in the wake of Critical Role's 2019 departure from the service, with the closure taking effect on March 31. This occurred only six days before the finale of L.A. by Night'''s second season was due to air, with the final epilogue Dark Hallways instead broadcasting on Twitch exclusively on April 5. In June, Geek & Sundry adapted the first two seasons of the show as a podcast for distribution via Spotify. The podcast also included a special that had been recorded live at Wondercon, set in between the second and third season. The third season aired on Twitch from June until September that year.

With Geek & Sundry in decline and facing major layoffs in 2020, production of the show was taken over by Paradox Interactive (owner of World of Darkness intellectual property such as Vampire: The Masquerade). Seasons 4 and 5 aired "exclusively on the World of Darkness Twitch channel" before being added to the official World of Darkness YouTube channel as VOD. Xander Jeanneret and Josephine McAdam joined the main cast for seasons 4 and 5. In August 2021, it was announced that the fifth season would conclude the current storyline of the show. Jason Carl, Brand Marketing Manager for World of Darkness and Storyteller for the show, stated that season 5 "is not the end of L.A. By Night". In June 2022, World of Darkness announced that Carl is the Storyteller of a sequel series, titled NY by Night, which is scheduled to premiere on July 1, 2022.

 Episodes 
 Series overview 

 Season 1 

 Season 2 

 Specials 

 Season 3 

 Season 4 

 Season 5 

 Reception 
Amanda Farough, VentureBeat, highlighted that L.A. by Night is an example of an actual play show sponsored by a TTRPG publisher. Farough wrote that the show "was created to give Vampire: The Masquerade and its community more visibility among a wider roleplaying audience, thanks in part to a partnership with Geek & Sundry. The publisher isn't interested in utilizing 'L.A. By Night' to drive sales, even though the show has hit over a million impressions per season between streaming and video-on-demand. Instead, World of Darkness leans into actual play shows to spread brand awareness, continue to build a global audience with players from across a spectrum of experience [...], and create positive communities that can share their experiences in safe, respectful ways".L.A. by Night was included in TNW's "The podcasts that got us through 2020" roundup — the article states that "LA By Night is pure escapism. It's a TV show that looks like a Zoom meeting of a group of professional actors playing Vampire: The Masquerade. It's a surreal experience. If you've never played Dungeons & Dragons or other tabletop roleplaying games, it's an excellent way to see how it's done by people who are really good at doing it. But the best part is that it only takes a few minutes to get past the fact that these are actors dressed up to sit at a dinner table and roll dice while describing scenes [...]. Once you're immersed, the effect is reminiscent of old-timey radio shows where a cast of characters would react as a narrator weaved a tale of adventure, mystery, or science fiction". Tristan Greene, in a separate article for TNW, stated that L.A. by Night is his favorite part of the extended World of Darkness universe and his "favorite vampire TV show ever". Greene highlighted that the show acts as an entry point to both tabletop gaming and the World of Darkness universe. Greene wrote that the cast manages "to seamlessly explain the rules and the gameplay as they go, so it's helpful for those trying to figure what a good game of Vampire should look like. Watching an actual world of characters and intrigue get improvised into existence in front of you is a fantastic motivation for newcomers to start telling their own stories in the World of Darkness. What's more important is that it's not a brand-placement advertisement gussied up to look like a game. It's evident LA By Night is a work of passion. [...] It's the sincerity of LA By Night, that is to say the genuine glee with which its cast members play the game, that makes it special. The main cast is exquisite and the guests have done an amazing job of fleshing out the other denizens of the chronicle".

The show was also on Screen Rant's 2021 "RPG Actual Plays Like Critical Role To Check Out For Halloween" list — the article states that "as a campaign where players are the monsters, much of the horror, tension, and humor in LA By Night stems from the player characters themselves and the harsh choices they make to appease their thirst for blood, advance their status in the cutthroat politics of vampire society, and the danger they face from the vampire-hunting forces of the Second Inquisition (should they flaunt their vampire status overmuch)". Colin Kerford, in a separate article for Screen Rant, highlighted that over the course of the show it has "brought together a star-studded cast of actors" and that "while it is at its core a live-play of a tabletop RPG, the series sets itself apart with higher production values than many others, including detailed makeup and costume work as well as special effects. Over the course of its five seasons, the show has functioned as a sort of sequel to Vampire: The Masquerade'', telling the story of two of the game's factions set some years after the plot detailed in the book".

References

External links 

 Official page at Geek & Sundry
 Official page at World of Darkness

2010s American LGBT-related television series
2010s YouTube series
2018 web series debuts
2020s American LGBT-related television series
2020s YouTube series
Actual play web series
American LGBT-related web series
Audio podcasts
Vampire: The Masquerade